The Caribbean Food Crop Society is the regional trade association serving agronomists and agriculture for countries bordering on the Caribbean Sea. Agriculture is the largest sector of the economy of the Caribbean and it affects every nation and territory within the region. The Caribbean Food Crop Society is the organization through which people in the field have the opportunity to meet to discuss research and shared concerns and objectives.

The society was founded in 1963 by Richard Marshall Bond, the Director, and Arnold Krochmal Assistant Director of the United States Department of Agriculture's Experimental Station on St. Croix, United States Virgin Islands. The association had its first annual meeting at the Sandy Lane Hotel in Barbados in 1964.

Venues by year

References

External links
 Caribbean Food Crop Society- Home
 Caribbean Food Crops Society - 2007
 C.F.C.S. 2011 Barbados - Home
 Abstract 1977 CFCS Conference
 SIDALC - Sistema de Informacion y Documentacion Agropecuaria de las Americas

Agricultural organizations based in the Caribbean